This is a list of cooking appliances that are used for cooking foods.

Cooking appliances

 Air fryer
 Bachelor griller
 Barbecue grill
 Beehive oven
 Brasero (heater)
 Brazier
 Bread machine
 Burjiko
 Butane torch
 Chapati maker
 Cheesemelter
 Chocolatera
 Chorkor oven
 Clome oven
 Comal (cookware)
 Combi steamer
 Communal oven
 Convection microwave
 Convection oven
 Corn roaster
 Crepe maker
 Deep fryer
 Earth oven
 Electric cooker
 Energy regulator
 Espresso machine
 Field kitchen
 Fire pot
 Flattop grill
 Food steamer
 Fufu Machine
 Griddle
 Halogen oven
 Haybox
 Hibachi
 Horno
 Hot box (appliance)
 Hot plate
 Instant Pot
 Kamado
 Kitchener range
 Kujiejun
 Kyoto box
 Makiyakinabe
 Masonry oven
 Mess kit
 Microwave oven
 Multicooker
 Oven
 Pancake machine
 Panini sandwich grill
 Popcorn maker
 Pressure cooker
 Pressure fryer
 Reflector oven
 Remoska
 Rice cooker
 Rice polisher
 Roasting jack
 Rocket mass heater
 Rotimatic
 Rotisserie
 Russian oven
 Sabbath mode
 Salamander broiler
 Samovar
 Sandwich toaster
 Self-cleaning oven
 Shichirin
 Slow cooker
 Solar cooker
 Sous-vide cooker
 Soy milk maker
 Stove
 Susceptor
 Tabun oven
 Tandoor
 Tangia
 Thermal immersion circulator
 Toaster and toaster ovens
 Turkey fryer
 Vacuum fryer
 Waffle iron
 Wet grinder
 Wine cooler
 Wood-fired oven

Boilers
 Coffee percolator
 Coffeemaker
 Electric water boiler
 Instant hot water dispenser
 Kettle

See also

 Appliance recycling
 Cooker
 Food processing
 Induction cooking 
 List of cooking techniques
 List of food preparation utensils
 List of home appliances
 List of ovens
 List of stoves

References

Cooking appliances
Technology-related lists
Food- and drink-related lists